Yuri Zhukov (born 1964), is a Russian ballet dancer.

Zhukov trained at the Vaganova Academy of Russian Ballet in St. Petersburg, Russia.

Zhukov was a soloist with the Kirov Ballet and a principal dancer with the San Francisco Ballet and the Birmingham Royal Ballet.

In 2008, he founded Zhukov Dance Theatre, a contemporary dance company in San Francisco.

References

1964 births
Russian male ballet dancers
Living people
San Francisco Ballet principal dancers
Birmingham Royal Ballet principal dancers
Mariinsky Ballet first soloists